Biến Hoá Hoàn Hảo (which translates into English as My Name Is...) is a Vietnamese reality competition talent show television series. The international version is provided by the Endemol-owned Shine Group. My Name Is... aired in several countries including the United States, Denmark, the Netherlands, and Chile.

Twenty-one contestants were selected after passing local preliminary competitions. The contestants must select one idol whose style is to inspire their performances throughout competition.  One contestant is eliminated each week until the live finale. Contestants perform with the coaching of three judges: Tran Thanh, Hari Won, Tai Chi.

Personnel 
The program was hosted by Đại Nghĩa.  The judges were Trấn Thành, Hari Won, and Chí Tài.  For episodes 6 and 8, Chí Tài was replaced by guest judge Việt Trinh.

Contestants

Weekly results

References 

2016 Vietnamese television series debuts
Talent shows